Tillandsia izabalensis is a species of flowering plant in the family Bromeliaceae, native to Belize, Guatemala, Honduras and Nicaragua in Central America, and in the south-west Caribbean. It was first described in 2012.

References

izabalensis
Flora of Belize
Flora of Guatemala
Flora of Honduras
Flora of Nicaragua
Flora of the Southwest Caribbean
Plants described in 2012
Flora without expected TNC conservation status